Clouds of Smoke may refer to:

Clouds of Smoke (1959 film), an Argentine film
Clouds of Smoke (2007 film), a documentary film